A spymaster is the person that leads a spy ring, or a secret service (such as an intelligence agency).

Historical spymasters

See also
List of American spies
List of British spies
List of German spies
List of fictional spymasters

References 
 https://general-history.com/famous-spy-masters-through-the-ages/

Notes

Spies by role